Pious may refer to:

 Farshad Pious (born 1962), Iranian retired footballer
 Minerva Pious (1903–1979), American actress
 Pious (novel), a 2010 novel by Kenn Bivins

See also
 List of people known as the Pious
 Piety
 Hasid, a Jewish honorific that can be translated as "pious"
 Salih (literal translation: "Pious"), a prophet mentioned in the Quran